Patrick Leahy (born 1940) is an American politician, who served as a United States Senator from Vermont.

Patrick Leahy may also refer to:
 Patrick Leahy (bishop) (1806–1875), Roman Catholic Archbishop of Cashel
 Patrick Leahy (Australian politician) (1860–1927), Queensland politician
 Patrick Leahy (athlete) (1877–1927), Irish Olympic athlete
 Pat Leahy (Tipperary hurler) (1857–?), Irish hurler for Tipperary
 Pat Leahy (Cork hurler) (1878–1950), Irish hurler for Cork
 Paddy Leahy (1892–1966), Irish hurler for Tipperary
 Paddy Leahy (footballer) (1874–1955), Australian rules footballer
 Pat Leahy (Australian footballer) (1917–2009), Australian rules footballer
 Pat Leahy (American football) (born 1951), placekicker
 Pat Leahy (ice hockey) (born 1979), ice hockey right wing
 Patrick F. Leahy, American academic administrator